E-anna  (house of heavens), also referred to as the Temple of Inanna, was an ancient Sumerian temple in Uruk.  Considered "the residence of Inanna" and Anu, it is mentioned several times in the Epic of Gilgamesh, and elsewhere.  The evolution of the gods to whom the temple was dedicated is the subject of scholarly study.

The Epic of Gilgamesh
From Tablet One:

He carved on a stone stela all of his toils,
and built the wall of Uruk-Haven,
the wall of the sacred Eanna Temple, the holy sanctuary.

See also

Uruk - Eanna district

References

External links

Ancient Near East temples
Mesopotamian religion
Uruk
Inanna